Prosoplus sinuatofasciatus is a species of beetle in the family Cerambycidae. It was described by Blanchard in 1855.

Subspecies
 Prosoplus sinuatofasciatus woodlarkianus Breuning, 1970
 Prosoplus sinuatofasciatus sinuatofasciatus Blanchard, 1855

References

Prosoplus
Beetles described in 1855